1996–97 Croatian First A League was the sixth season of the Croatian handball league since its independence.

League table

Sources 
 Fredi Kramer, Dražen Pinević: Hrvatski rukomet = Croatian handball, Zagreb, 2009.; page. 178
 Kruno Sabolić: Hrvatski športski almanah 1996/1997, Zagreb, 1997. 
 Petar Orgulić: 50 godina rukometa u Rijeci, Rijeka, 2004.; pages 250, 251

References

External links
EHF
Croatian Handball Federation

1996-97
handball
handball
Croatia